Aall is a Norwegian surname. Notable people with the surname include:

Anathon Aall (1867–1943), Norwegian academic
Hans Aall (1869–1946), Norwegian museum director
Hans J. C. Aall (1806–1894), Norwegian politician
Jacob Aall (1773–1844), Norwegian historian and statesman
Jørgen Aall (1771–1833), Norwegian ship-owner and politician
Nicolai Benjamin Aall (1739–1798), Norwegian ship-owner and businessman
Niels Aall (1769–1854), Norwegian estate owner, businessman and politician
Nils Aall Barricelli (1912–1993), Norwegian-Italian mathematician
Jacob Bjerknes (1897–1975), Norwegian meteorologist, born Jacob Aall Bonnevie Bjerknes
Jacob Aall Bonnevie (1838–1904), Norwegian educator and politician
Jørgen Aall Flood (1820–1892), Norwegian politician
Jakob Larsen (1888–1974), American classical scholar, born Jacob Aall Ottesen Larsen
J. A. O. Preus (1883–1961), American politician, born Jacob Aall Ottesen Preus
J. A. O. Preus II (1920–1994), American religious leader, born Jacob Aall Ottesen Preus II

See also
Aall (Norwegian family)
AALL (disambiguation)

Norwegian-language surnames